Ipomoea stans is a species of flowering plant  in the bindweed and morning glory family Convolvulaceae, that goes by the common names tumbavaqueros or espantalobos.

The species is native to Mexico where it is widely used to treat seizures and nervous disorders.

References 

stans
Flora of Mexico
Taxa named by Antonio José Cavanilles